Portals of Torsh is a supplement for fantasy role-playing games published by Judges Guild in 1980.

Plot summary
Portals of Torsh is a campaign setting for midlevel characters, a fantasy world accessible by magical portal.  The prehistoric world of Torsh is briefly described (including wilderness encounters), with more detailed descriptions of two towns (one human, one lizardman) and a mini-scenario set in a lizard-wizard's tower.

Portals of Torsh presents a small continent mainly populated with lizard-men and prehistoric reptiles, as well as a human-dominated plateau community.  The adventure includes dungeon, ruin, and wilderness encounters.  Teleportation portals, built by a lost race, are scattered across the continent of Torsh; one or more may be used for travel to and from the DM's home world.

The premise of this module is that an ancient race created a series of portals that connected worlds and then died out. The types and peculiarities of the various portals are given along with tables for generating them for a campaign. This module is approved for use with AD&D. The adventure involves a human colony on a plateau of another planet. The planet itself is somewhat earthlike, but on it nothing beyond the lizard ever evolved, so the dominant native race is Lizardmen. Since it has an unearthly biological system, plants native to the planet are a slow poison for humans. One plateau, which is settled by the descendants of a group that fled there through another portal and stayed, has been made habitable.

Publication history
Portals of Torsh was written by Rudy Kraft, with a cover by Jennell Jaquays, and was published by Judges Guild in 1980 as a 48-page book.

Reception
Aaron Allston reviewed the adventure in The Space Gamer No. 31. He commented that "Anyone really interested in a pre-fab lizard-man continent may want to look at this one." He stated that "This adventure has one advantage in that it is specifically designed to be accessible by any number of campaigns" because of the portals, but added that "logical access is not that big of a plus.  The adventure is simply not very interesting.  Characters can wander around wasting monsters, gathering loot, and gaining experience, all without having much fun." Allston concluded his review by stating "Overall, this supplement will probably appeal only to those DMs who aren't imaginative enough to create something better."

Portals of Torsh was reviewed in Dragon #44 (December 1980) by William Fawcett.  He noted that the portals in the adventure were "interesting and bear an obvious resemblance to those of D.J. Cherryh and other science-fiction novels using a similar approach". He commented that "Most of the module is based upon the interaction of the humans with the more numerous and physically stronger lizardmen. The slowly poisonous environment is a unique touch that will make your players pay more attention to some fundamentals of survival that are often overshadowed by the magic and combat." Fawcett added: "An even more detailed than normal background is given on the planet, its economy, societies, etc. and comprises a significant part of the module. An adventure in this module will be a 'wilderness' adventure (as opposed to a 'dungeon' adventure) in that there are no detailed goals. This allows for more variety, but gives the DM a lot more to prepare." He commented on the presentation: "Several maps are given, some covering an entire continent. Most are given without scale and the most detailed will show only sections of a city. Greater detail is then left for the judge to contribute. There are many ideas that are worth utilizing in the module. A detailed handling of dinosaurs (earth-type) is included, plus several tables that would be useful for generating encounters on any lost plateaus on your own earth. The art is again visually pleasing, but most often is not directly related to the material being discussed on the same page." Fawcett concluded his review by saying, "This is a module that could be the basis of an entire campaign. There is certainly enough here to make the next curse (or teleport trap) to another planet more than a passing frustration. There is even the means of eventual return, via another portal."

Notes

References

Judges Guild fantasy role-playing game supplements
Role-playing game supplements introduced in 1980